Stuttgart–Strasbourg was a road bicycle race held annually in France and Germany, between Stuttgart and Strasbourg. It was first held in 1966 and held annually until 1996 as an amateur race. A revival was held in 2005 on the UCI Europe Tour but the race was not held again.

Winners

External links
 

UCI Europe Tour races
Defunct cycling races in France
Recurring sporting events established in 1966
1966 establishments in France
1966 establishments in Germany
Cycle races in France
Recurring sporting events disestablished in 2005
2005 disestablishments in France
2005 disestablishments in Germany
Defunct cycling races in Germany